William James Henry Traynor (born July 4, 1845 in Brantford, Ontario) was a Canadian-American anti-Catholic political activist. He is best known for heading the American Protective Association, a nationalist and anti-Catholic organization.

Biography

He moved to Detroit, where he was editor of the anti-Catholic weekly, The Patriotic American, and was elected Supreme Grand Master of the Loyal Orange Institution of the United States.

Traynor was elected Supreme President of the American Protective Association in 1893, and he continued to head that organization during its peak of influence in the middle 1890s. He continued to lead that organization until APA founder Henry F. Bowers was returned as the group's leader in 1903.

Footnotes

Works

 "The Aims and Methods of the 'APA,'" North American Review, vol. 159, whole no. 452 (July 1894), pp. 67-76.
 "The Menace of Romanism," North American Review, vol. 161, whole no. 465 (Aug. 1895), pp. 129-140.
 "Policy and Power of the APA," North American Review, vol. 162, whole no. 475 (June 1896), pp. 658-666.
 The Devil's Catechism: Being a List of Questions and Answers Compiled from Standard Roman Catholic Authorities. New York: P. Eckler, 1920.

Further reading

 Bennett, David H. The Party of Fear: From Nativist Movements to the New Right in American History.  University of North Carolina Press, 1988.
 Higham, John. "The Mind of a Nativist: Henry F. Bowers and the A.P.A.," American Quarterly, vol. 4, no. 1 (Spring 1952), pp. 16–24. In JSTOR
 Higham, John. Strangers in the Land: Patterns of American Nativism, 1860-1925. New Brunswick, NJ: Rutgers University Press, 1955.
 Jensen, Richard J. The Winning of the Midwest: Social and Political Conflict, 1888-1896. Chicago: University of Chicago Press, 1971.
 Kinzer, Donald L., An Episode in Anti-Catholicism: The American Protective Association. Seattle: University of Washington Press, 1964.
 Manfra, Jo A. "Hometown Politics and the American Protective Association, 1887-1890." The Annals of Iowa, vol. 55 (1996), pp. 138-166. Online
 Marsden, K. Gerald. "Patriotic Societies and American Labor: The American Protective Association in Wisconsin," Wisconsin Magazine of History, vol. 41, no. 4 (Summer 1958), pp. 287-294. in JSTOR
 Schlup, Leonard C. "American Protective Society," in Leonard C. Schlup and Ryan, James Gilbert (eds.) Historical Dictionary of the Gilded Age. Armonk, NY: M.E. Sharpe, 2003; pg. 15.
 Lipset, Seymour M. and Earl Raab. The Politics of Unreason: Right Wing Extremism in America, 1790–1970. New York: Harper and Row, 1970.
 Wallace, Les. The Rhetoric of Anti-Catholicism: The American Protective Association, 1887-1911. New York: Garland Publishers, 1990.
 Wiltz, John E. "APA-ism in Kentucky and Elsewhere," The Register of the Kentucky Historical Society, vol. 56, no. 2 (April 1958), pp. 143–155. in JSTOR

1845 births
Year of death missing
American activists
Canadian activists
Anti-Catholic activists
Ulster Scots people
Activists from Ontario
Pre-Confederation Ontario people
Canadian emigrants to the United States
American Protective Association